Eberhard Gienger (born 21 July 1951) is a German politician (CDU) and former West German gymnast. He competed at the 1972 and 1976 Summer Olympics, winning bronze in the latter.

Gymnastics career 
During his gymnastics career from 1971 to 1981, Gienger won 36 German championship titles; one gold and three silver medals in world championships; three gold, two silver and two bronze medals in European championships, and one Olympic bronze medal.

Gienger was an outstanding high bar artist: He won the European Championships in 1973, 1975 and 1981; he won gold in the 1974 World Championships, and won the bronze medal in the 1976 Olympic Games. For these feats he was elected German Sportsman of the Year in 1974 and 1978. The Gienger salto on the high bar and on the uneven bars is named after him.

Political career 
Gienger was a member of the German National Olympic Committee from 1986 to 2006, and since 2006 has been the Vice President of the Deutscher Olympischer Sportbund, the successor organization to the German NOC.

Gienger entered politics in 2001 and became a member of the Christian Democratic Union. He has been a member of the German Parliament since the 2002 elections, representing the Neckar-Zaber electoral district of the southern German state of Baden-Württemberg. In parliament, he has since been serving on the Committee on Sports and the Committee on Education, Research and Technology Assessment.
In February 2020, Gienger announced he would not seek reelection in the 2021 German federal election.

References

Further reading 
 Jo Viellvoye, Josef Göhler: "Eberhard Gienger. Das Abenteuer der Turnkunst" Badenia, Karlsruhe 1978, 
 Andreas Götze, Jürgen Uhr: "Eberhard Gienger präsentiert Mond-Salto. Die großen Erfinder" Steinmeier, Nördlingen 1994,

External links 

 
 
 
 Parliamentary home page of Eberhard Gienger

1951 births
Living people
People from Künzelsau
German Protestants
German male artistic gymnasts
Olympic bronze medalists for West Germany
Olympic medalists in gymnastics
Gymnasts at the 1972 Summer Olympics
Gymnasts at the 1976 Summer Olympics
Members of the Bundestag for Baden-Württemberg
Medalists at the 1976 Summer Olympics
Medalists at the World Artistic Gymnastics Championships
Universiade medalists in gymnastics
Universiade gold medalists for West Germany
Members of the Bundestag 2017–2021
Members of the Bundestag 2013–2017
Members of the Bundestag 2009–2013
Members of the Bundestag 2005–2009
Members of the Bundestag 2002–2005
Members of the Bundestag for the Christian Democratic Union of Germany
Medalists at the 1973 Summer Universiade
Recipients of the Cross of the Order of Merit of the Federal Republic of Germany
Recipients of the Order of Merit of Baden-Württemberg
European champions in gymnastics